The 2015–16 Biathlon World Cup – World Cup 4 was held in Ruhpolding, Germany, from 8 January until 10 January 2016. It had been scheduled to be held in Oberhof, but due to lack of snow it was relocated in Ruhpolding.

Schedule of events

Medal winners

Men

Women

References 

4
2016 in German sport
January 2016 sports events in Europe
2016 in Bavaria
World Cup - World Cup 4,2015-16
Sports competitions in Bavaria